The 2022 USL Championship Playoffs (branded as the 2022 USL Championship Playoffs presented by Hisense for sponsorship reasons) is the post-season championship of the 2022 USL Championship. It is the twelfth edition of the USL Championship Playoffs. The playoffs began October 22, and concluded with the USL Championship Final on November 13.

San Antonio FC won the regular season.  Defending title holders Orange County SC did not qualify for the playoffs.

Format
The top seven teams in each conference qualify for the playoffs.  With the top team from each conference entering the competition during the conference semi-finals.  After the opening round the tournament will be reseeded to ensure that the top team from each conference plays the lowest seeded team and hosting rights will be determined by regular season record.  All playoff matches will be streamed live on ESPN+ except the Championship final on ESPN2, ESPN Deportes, and Sirius XM FC.

Conference standings 

Eastern Conference

Western Conference

Bracket

Schedule

Conference Quarter-finals

Conference Semi-finals

Conference Finals

USL Championship Final 

Similar to the 2022 MLS playoffs, the final featured the top seeds in the Eastern and Western Conferences, Louisville City FC and San Antonio FC, who were their conferences' regular-season and play-off champions. As overall regular-season champion, San Antonio FC had home-field advantage for the final.

For Louisville City, 2022 marks the fourth Championship final in five seasons, having won two of their previous three in 2017 and 2018. For San Antonio FC, this is a first USL Championship final.

Championship Game MVP: Santiago Patiño (SAN)

Top goalscorers

Awards
Goal of the Playoffs:   Charlie Dennis (OAK)
Save of the Playoffs:   Jordan Farr (SAN)

References

2022 USL Championship season
USL Championship Playoffs